Mataano  ("Twins" in the Somali language) is a women's fashion line. Founded in 2008, it is owned by Somali-American twin fashion designers Ayaan and Idyl Mohallim.

Founders
Ayaan and Idyl Mohallim were born in Alabama to Somali parents.  They moved to Somalia at an early age, and spent their first nine years there. When the Somali Civil War broke out in the early 1990s, they returned to the United States.

Settling in northern Virginia, just outside Washington D.C., the sisters developed an interest in fashion after their mother bought them fashion magazines. Their family put an emphasis on education, envisioning the girls' studying at top schools in preparation for professional careers. Upon graduation from college, the twins moved to New York City to pursue their goal of becoming fashion designers. Idyl quickly secured an internship with Betsey Johnson, where she acquired skills in design technique and color. Ayaan obtained a production job at Jill Stuart.

Fashion line

Mataano specializes in contemporary ready-to-wear pieces for women. It began mainly with dress production, with an accent on comfort. Plans were also made to branch out into other areas of fashion.

To establish a foothold in the fashion market, Ayaan and Idyl focused on ensuring their wear was ready for distribution. They then retained the services of a PR firm to help them advertise their brand, in the process sending out press releases and look books, as well as establishing a website. Their marketing efforts eventually earned the designers an invitation to the Oprah Winfrey Show to Skype with Mary-Kate and Ashley Olsen. The Mohallim sisters have also been invited to showcase in Sweden, South Africa, Jamaica and at New York Fashion Week.

Mataano showcased its premier collection for Spring 2009 in New York City. Consisting of ten dresses, it attracted attention in the fashion industry and received enthusiastic reviews. The brand has since launched six other collections during New York Fashion Week.

The Somali filmmaker Idil Ibrahim later directed Mataano's official promotional video for the fashion line's 2009 Fall collection. She likewise directed the official promotional video for the company's 2010 Spring collection.

In Spring 2012, supermodel and fellow Somali Iman also signed Ayaan and Idyl as brand ambassadors for her cosmetics line.

The Mohallim twins say they strive to incorporate their experiences and influences as Somali Americans into their designs, reflecting both cultures in their work. Mataano's Spring 2013 collection in part drew inspiration from Los Angeles' beaches, featuring light silks and organzas. According to co-founder Ayaan, the sisters ultimately design for multicultural women like themselves. The silks and colorful hues that adorn the fashion line are typical of Somali female attire.

In terms of other fashion designers, Ayaan and Idyl's primary influences include Tracy Reese and Carolina Herrera, whom they feel have an international appeal. They also admire the work of Donna Karen and Oscar de la Renta.

As of 2013, Mataano is designed and manufactured in New York City.

References

External links
Mataano - Official website

Clothing brands of the United States
Clothing companies established in 2008
2008 establishments in the United States
High fashion brands
Sibling duos